Drotsky is a surname. Notable people with the surname include:

John Drotsky (born 1984), Namibian rugby union player
Martinus Drotsky, for whom Drotsky's Cavern (Gcwihaba), cave in Botswana, was named

See also
Trotsky (surname)